Susan Kudzibatira (born 30 September 1985) is a Zimbabwean woman cricketer. She has played for Zimbabwe at the 2008 Women's Cricket World Cup Qualifier.

References

External links 

1985 births
Living people
Zimbabwean women cricketers